Karagiye (Qaraqiia oiysy; Karagiye means Black Jaw in Turkic) is a  long karst trench close to the Caspian Sea. It is the lowest point in Central Asia, Kazakhstan, and the former Soviet Union. It is also known as the Karagiye Depression and Karagiye Mountain Trench.

The trench was formed as soluble limestone, dolomite and gypsum dissolved forming potholes, funnels and caves that eventually collapsed. Today the trench features many scarps and offsets and generates long rain clouds caused by the air rising above it. There is a vernal lake in the south-west of the trench and a stream rising from a drilled well that disappears back into the ground within the trench.

The trench is inhabited by mouflon, corsac, snakes, hares and vultures. It is the only place within the Mangyshlak Peninsula where mushrooms grow and these are collected by locals.

See also
Karakiya District
Caspian Depression
List of countries by lowest point
List of places on land with elevations below sea level

References

Deserts of Central Asia
Deserts of Kazakhstan
Depressions of Kazakhstan
Lowest points
Karst
Landforms of Europe
Landforms of Asia